The  (Wiesbaden program) is a program for Protestant church architecture developed in Wiesbaden, the capital of Hesse, Germany, in the late 19th century. It contradicted an older  (Eisenach rule) from 1861 which demanded that new church buildings had to follow Romanesque Revival style or Gothic Revival style.

The program was initiated by Emil Veesenmeyer, minister of the Bergkirche, and Johannes Otzen, an architect who designed the Ringkirche (1892–94) as the first church following the principles of the program. A focus is the unity of pulpit, altar, and organ, which should be together and visible from every seat for the congregation.

Literature 
 Emil Veesenmeyer:  Evangelisches Gemeindeblatt, Dillenburg 1895
  . Darin die Artikel
 Peter Seyfried: Johannes Otzens opus ultimum
 Holger Brülls: 
 Anne Heinig:  Regensburg 2004.
 Urs Baur:Zur Restaurierung der Kirche Bühl 1983–1984.
 Ralf-Andreas Gmelin:  Wiesbaden, 3rd edition, 2008.
 Peter Genz: . Kiel 2011, .

External links 
 Gemeinsame Wege – gemeinsame Räume Lecture at the Hessisch-Thüringische Denkmalpflege-Tagung 1996

Church architecture